The BELTRI ("Balance Elevator-Lift for Tractioning Recumbent Individuals") is an apparatus designed for the mobilization of bedridden patients. It consists of a metallic structure with pulleys and ropes that uses a counterbalance to lift the weight of a patient without difficulty.

The BELTRI was first introduced in Austria in the 19th century by Dr. Carl Emmert, and is now used throughout the world by many nurses and physicians.

References

Medical equipment